Sex & Drugs & Rock & Roll is a 2010 biographical film about English new wave musician Ian Dury, starring Andy Serkis as Dury. The film follows Dury's rise to fame and documents his personal battle with the disability caused by having contracted polio during childhood. The effect that his disability and his lifestyle have upon his relationships is also a focal point of the film. The title of the film is derived from Dury's 1977 7" single, "Sex & Drugs & Rock & Roll".

Principal photography began on 29 April 2009 in Egham, Surrey and theatre footage was shot 1–3 June at Watford Palace Theatre.

Cast
 Andy Serkis as Ian Dury
 Naomie Harris as Denise
 Ray Winstone as Bill Dury
 Olivia Williams as Betty Dury
 Noel Clarke as Desmond
 Toby Jones as Hargreaves
 Ralph Ineson as The Sulphate Strangler
 Mackenzie Crook as Russell Hardy
 Bill Milner as Baxter Dury
 Michael Maloney as Graham
 Arthur Darvill as Mick Gallagher
 Luke Evans as Clive Richards
 James Jagger as John Turnbull
 Tom Hughes as Chaz Jankel
 Clifford Samuel as Charley Charles
 Charlotte Beaumont as Jemima Dury
 Jennifer Carswell as Ruby
 Stephanie Carswell as Mia
 Aidan Knight as Ginger Spanish Nicky
 Joseph Kennedy as Davey Payne
 Eku Edewor as a party girl
 Catherine Balavage as Crazy drug girl (uncredited)

Reception
On Rotten Tomatoes the film has an approval rating of 73% based on reviews from 51 critics. The site's critical consensus state: "Sex & Drugs & Rock & Roll pays appropriately uninhibited tribute to a pioneering artist -- and proves Andy Serkis can be every bit as compelling in a non-motion-capture role."
On Metacritic it has a score of 57% based on reviews from 6 critics, indicating "Mixed or average reviews".

Awards

References

External links 
 
Sex & Drugs & Rock & Roll at Rotten Tomatoes

2010 films
2010 comedy-drama films
2010s biographical films
British biographical films
British comedy-drama films
British rock music films
New wave music
Films about disability
Films directed by Mat Whitecross
Musical films based on actual events
Films set in London
Biographical films about musicians
Biographical films about singers
Cultural depictions of rock musicians
Cultural depictions of British men
Films shot in Surrey
2010s English-language films
2010s British films